mbanx (later BMO mbanx Direct) was a Canadian virtual bank that operated as a division of Bank of Montreal starting in October 1996. "mbanx" was erroneously thought by some to be a new brand name for the entire bank, as BMO focused virtually all its marketing efforts on the new unit during its first few months.

Developed at the start of the Internet banking revolution, mbanx was deemed the "first North America-wide virtual, full-service bank"; it had no branches and was run separately from BMO proper. It launched to much fanfare, with an advertising campaign featuring Bob Dylan's "The Times They Are a-Changin'". The advertisements used the logotype form mbanx.

However, by the early 2000s, BMO and all other major Canadian banks had integrated Internet banking into their regular, branch-based services, making mbanx redundant. As a result, BMO has not advertised under the mbanx name since 2001 or earlier, and the division was eventually reabsorbed into the bank's main operations. Former mbanx customers now receive services under the BMO banner; those who did not transition to a local BMO branch continue to be serviced by a direct banking "branch" within the main bank.

References

External links 
 Official website; currently redirects to BMO.com

Defunct banks of Canada
Bank of Montreal
Banks established in 1996
Banks disestablished in 2000